The year 1911 in archaeology involved some significant events.

Explorations 
 24 July: Hiram Bingham III rediscovers Machu Picchu, Peru.

Excavations
 Excavations of the ruins of Tell el-Amarna, Egypt, by Ludwig Borchardt of the Deutsche Orient-Gesellschaft (continues to 1914).
 First excavations of ancient Samarra, Iraq, by Ernst Herzfeld (continues to 1914).
 First excavations of Tell Halaf, Syria, by Max von Oppenheim (continues to 1913).
 Excavations of the Hittite city of Carchemish, northern Syria, by D. G. Hogarth of the Ashmolean Museum with Leonard Woolley and T. E. Lawrence (continues to 1914).
 First excavations of Hengistbury Head by J. P. Bushe-Fox.
 First excavations at Beit Shemesh (continues to 1912).
 Excavations at the necropolis of Tanagra (Boeotia) by Nikolaos Papadakis.

Publications
James Curle: A Roman Frontier Post and its People: the Fort of Newstead.
Grafton Elliot Smith: The Ancient Egyptians and the Origin of Civilization.

Finds
 Venus of Laussel.
 First artefacts found at Dolní Věstonice.
 Magdalenian Girl.
 Clacton Spear.

Awards

Miscellaneous

Births
 Leslie Peter Wenham, Yorkshire archaeologist (died 1990)

Deaths
 19 August: John Robert Mortimer, Yorkshire archaeologist (born 1825)

References

Archaeology
Archaeology
Archaeology by year